Fourth Estate is a traditional term for the press; it may also refer to "the mob" (as in mob rule) or the proletariat.

Fourth Estate may also refer to:

Publications
 The Fourth Estate (novel), by Jeffrey Archer
 Fourth Estate (George Mason University newspaper) or IV Estate, a student newspaper published by George Mason University
 The Fourth Estate, a student newspaper published by the University of Wisconsin–Green Bay
 The Fourth Estate, a student newspaper published by the Harrisburg Area Community College
 The 4th Estate, a weekly newspaper in Halifax, Nova Scotia (1969–1977)
 4th Estate, an imprint of HarperCollins

Government
 Fourth Estate of the pre-Union Scottish Parliament, the Shire Commissioners
 Fourth Estate (Department of Defense)

Other
 The Fourth Estate (film), a 1940 documentary film directed by Paul Rotha
 The Fourth Estate (painting), a c. 1901 painting by Giuseppe Pellizza da Volpedo
 The Fourth Estate (TV series), a Showtime documentary series
 Fourth Estate Public Benefit Corporation, a journalism association and non-governmental organization